State Highway 24 (SH-24) is a  long state highway in Idaho that runs east west from Shoshone, Idaho on the far west to Minidoka and Acequia on the far east.

Route description
SH-24 begins at I-84 near Rupert. The highway ends at U.S. Highway 93 in Shoshone.

Junction list

See also

 List of state highways in Idaho
 List of highways numbered 24

References

External links

024
Transportation in Minidoka County, Idaho
Transportation in Lincoln County, Idaho